Kaynarca station is an unused railway station in the Kaynarca neighborhood of Pendik, Istanbul. The station was originally built in 1967 by the Turkish State Railways in anticipation of electric commuter rail service from Haydarpaşa to Gebze. The station was closed down 29 April 2012 and demolished shortly after. A new station was built in its place in 2014 as part of the rehabilitation of the railway for the Marmaray commuter rail system, but due to construction delays on other sections of the railway, Kaynarca station remains unused. The opening of the station was for on March 12, 2019.

References

Railway stations in Istanbul Province
Railway stations opened in 1967
1967 establishments in Turkey
Pendik